Surya Chandra is a 1985 Indian Telugu-language action drama film written and directed by Vijaya Nirmala, based on the book of the same title by Chittareddy Suryakumari. Produced by S. Ramanand, the film has musical score by Ramesh Naidu. It stars Krishna Ghattamaneni, Jaya Prada, Prabha, Deepa and Kaikala Satyanarayana in the key roles. The film was declared a Hit at the box office.

Cast 
 Krishna Ghattamaneni as Surya Chandra
 Jaya Prada as Pooja
J.V. Somayajulu as Ramachandra Rao
 Prabha as Lakshmi
 Deepa as Deepthi
 Kaikala Satyanarayana as Narayana Rao
Anjali Devi
 Mano Chitra
 Mucherla Aruna as Rekha
 Giribabu as Bhasker Rao
Y.G. Mahendran (voiced by Rallapalli) as Kabir
 Suttivelu as Maruthi Rao
 P. L. Narayana as Papa Rao
Rajanala as Surya Chandra's prospective father-in-law
Subha as Nandana
Radha Kumari
Suryakantham
Banerji
Modukuri Sathyam
Baby Meena as Keerthi

Soundtrack 

The film had its soundtrack album scored and composed by Ramesh Naidu. Veturi Sundrarama Murthy penned the lyrics.

Citations

External links 

1985 films
Indian action drama films
Films based on Indian novels
Films scored by Ramesh Naidu
1980s action drama films
1980s Telugu-language films
Films directed by Vijaya Nirmala